Albert Francis "Peter" Hamilton (24 June 1931 - 28 September 1981) was an Australian rules footballer who played for  in the Victorian Football League (VFL) between 1952 and 1957.

Hamilton was recruited from the Brunswick Amateurs Football Club after a trial in 1951. He made his debut for North Melbourne in 1952.

References

External links

1931 births
1981 deaths
North Melbourne Football Club players
Australian rules footballers from Victoria (Australia)
People from Ararat, Victoria